The One is the second studio album by Indonesian singer Afgan. It was released on April 1, 2010. The album has 12 songs, including "Bukan Cinta Biasa", "Panah Asmara", "Dia Dia Dia", and "Bawalah Cintaku".

The single "Cinta 2 Hati" was used on the soundtrack of the Indonesian film Cinta 2 Hati, starring Afgan and Olivia Jensen.

The single "Seperti Bintang" was used in an advertisement for the Indonesian brand Panadol Cold & Flu.

Track listing

References

2010 albums
Afgansyah Reza albums
Indonesian-language albums